Henri Jules Joseph Nibelle (6 November 1883 – 18 November 1967) was a French organist, choral conductor and composer.

Biography 
Born in Briare, son and grandson of organists, Henri Nibelle attended the école Niedermeyer as early as 1898, before entering the Conservatoire de Paris, where in 1906 he won a first prize on fugue in the class of Fauré and a 1st accessit of organ in 1910 in the class of Guilmant. At the École Niedermeyer, Henri Nibelle was a student of Henri Büsser, with Maurice Le Boucher, Defosse, Roger Pénau. He also studied with Louis Vierne who dedicated to him Caprice, the third of the Pièces de Fantaisie for organ Op. 51. He began his career as an organist on the choir organ of the Versailles Cathedral in 1907. Two years later, he was appointed titular of that of the Saint-Vincent-de-Paul church, then became organist at the Grand Organ of Saint-François-de-Sales in 1912, and succeeded Isidore Massuelle as maître de chapelle of this same church in 1931.

Having become almost blind, he left Saint-François-de-Sales in 1959 to retire to Nice and dedicate himself to the composition of religious works: short masses, solemn masses, psalms, motets, spiritual hymns, etc.

Nibelle died in Nice on 18 November 1967 aged 84.

Works 
 Music for chorus
Mass "Ecce Sacerdos magnus", 
Mass "Te Deum"
Mass "Ave Maris Stella"
Messe Héroïque de Jeanne d’Arc. (ed. 1951)
Psalm 117
Pie Jesu
Ave verum corpus
Ave Maria
 Prose "Inviolata"Music for organ (and harmonium)Offertory in D minor in "Maîtres contemporains de l'orgue", vol. 1 (1912)50 Pièces sur des thèmes liturgiques des dimanches et les fêtes de l’année for organ or harmonium, 1935 (Schola Cantorum de Paris publishings).Carillon orléanais.Carillon orléanais on Archive.org (1938)Toccata (1947)Preludes for the Holy Sacrament2 Préludes and fugues (organ and Liturgy)Prelude and fugue on "Alma Redemptoris Mater" (Orgue et Liturgie)Prélude et fugue on "Salve Regina" (Orgue et Liturgie)Rhapsodies de Noël for organVariations on a Chant de Noël (1960)Messe pour orgue en l’honneur de la Sainte-ViergeToccata and Fugue on "Regina Caeli"Toccata on "Victimae paschali laudes"Les Dimanches et Fêtes de l'organiste grégorien, 8 vol. (Schola Cantorum)

 Sources 
 Musica et Memoria Denis Havard de la Montagne, Les Organistes et les maîtres de chapelle de l’église Saint-Vincent-de-Paul à Paris, Les Cahiers Boëllmann-Gigout, n°2/3, December 1997–March 1998.
 Marc Honegger, Dictionnaire de la musique, vol. II - Les Hommes et leurs Œuvres L-Z, Paris, Bordas, 1970.

 References 

 External links 

 YouTube Psaume 116'' par l'ensemble vocal Frontières et Vallées.
 Art du Temps Libre picture of H. Nibelle.
 Henri Nibelle on Musicalics
 Henri Nibelle on Organ-biography.info

People from Loiret
1883 births
1967 deaths
Schola Cantorum de Paris alumni
French classical organists
French male organists
20th-century French composers
French classical composers
French male classical composers
French composers of sacred music
French choral conductors
French male conductors (music)
20th-century organists
20th-century French conductors (music)
20th-century French male musicians
Male classical organists